The Robert Morris Colonials men's basketball team is the basketball team that represents Robert Morris University in Moon Township, Pennsylvania, United States. The school's team currently competes in the Horizon League. The Colonials current head coach is Andrew Toole who is in his eighth season at RMU. Toole was hired when, after three years in charge and 73 wins, head coach Mike Rice Jr. left the program in 2010 to take the head coaching job at Rutgers.

The team's most recent appearance in the NCAA Division I men's basketball tournament was in 2015, where the Colonials beat North Florida in the First Four, but then suffered a loss to No. 1-seeded Duke (the eventual national champion) in the First Round. Five years earlier, in the 2010 NCAA tournament, the 15th-seed Colonials nearly upset No. 9-ranked Villanova in the First Round before losing in overtime. The team is also known for its upset over No. 1-seeded (and 2012 national champion) Kentucky at the buzzer in the opening round of the 2013 National Invitation Tournament and another upset over traditional Big East powerhouse St. John's in the opening round of the 2014 NIT. However, in both cases, the Colonials lost in the second round.

Postseason results

NCAA tournament results
The Colonials have appeared in the NCAA tournament eight times. They have also qualified for the 2020 NCAA tournament, which was cancelled amid the COVID-19 pandemic.

NIT results
The Colonials have appeared in three National Invitation Tournaments (NIT). Their record is 2–3.

CIT results
The Colonials have appeared in two CollegeInsider.com Postseason Tournament (CIT). Their record is 3–2.

Home court 
On January 30, 2017, Robert Morris announced plans to build a new basketball and volleyball facility named the UPMC Events Center on the school's campus. The basketball team's former home, the Charles L. Sewall Center was to be demolished to make room for the new arena. The 2017–18 Colonials played their home games at the PPG Paints Arena and at the Palumbo Center on the campus of Duquesne University. The 2018–19 Colonials played their home games at the North Athletic Complex on campus.  The UPMC Events Center opened in May 2019.

References

External links